Lithops dinteri is a species of the genus Lithops of the family Aizoaceae. It is a succulent plant native to the desert climate of Southern Africa, where is receives an average yearly rainfall of 464mm. The succulent plant is named after Mortiz Kurt Dinter, a German botanist of the late 19th and early 20th century. He was a collector of exotic succulents and his collection numbered around 8,400 pressed specimens.

Description
Lithops dinteri has leaves growing in pairs, and those pairs forming clumps of leaves. The leaves are thick, and hardly possess any stem. They have a small gap between them, out of which a yellow flower can blossom. The color of the sand or soil they grow in can determine the color of their lobes. Colors can range from red, to brown, to grey, and to cream. The leaves can also present red dots of the top, varying in number and size from plant to plant.  The sides of the leaves are usually a purplish-green.

References

dinteri